2012 Desert Diamond Cup (formerly known as the Desert Cup and also known as the FC Tucson Desert Diamond Cup) is a soccer exhibition featuring four soccer teams from Major League Soccer, held between February 22 – March 3, 2012. The preseason tournament was played at the Kino Sports Complex 11,000 seat main stadium in Tucson, Arizona. This is the 2nd annual Desert Diamond Cup. New York Red Bulls and Sporting Kansas City of Major League Soccer participated in the first tournament in March 2011.

Teams 
The following four clubs participated in the 2012 tournament:
Los Angeles Galaxy (first appearance)
New England Revolution (first appearance)
New York Red Bulls (second appearance)
Real Salt Lake (first appearance)

Table standings

Matches
The tournament featured a round-robin group stage followed by third-place and championship matches.

Tournament

Third place match

Final

Final placement

References

External links 
 

2012
2012 in American soccer
February 2012 sports events in the United States
March 2012 sports events in the United States